We the Kings is the debut studio album by American rock band We the Kings.

Background
We the Kings formed in 2005 while its members attended Manatee High School. The band's line-up consisted of vocalist Travis Clark, guitarist Hunter Thomsen, bassist Drew Thomsen, and drummer Danny Duncan. In summer, the group toured with Don't Die Cindy. PureVolume, a place where people could upload their music, helped the band's popularity.

We the Kings was produced by S*A*M and Sluggo, and recorded at Mission Sound, and Fresh Kills Music, both in New York City. Sean Gould and Scott Riebling acted as engineers. Lou Giordano mixed almost every track, save for "Secret Valentine", "Check Yes Juliet", and "Stay Young", which were done by Tom Lord-Alge and his assistant Femio Hernandez. Chris Gehringer mastered the album at Sterling Sound, also in New york City. According to Travis Clark, the album was "really guitar driven, with those poppy catchy choruses".

Release
In July 2007, We the Kings supported the White Tie Affair and Fireworks on the Act Like You Know Tour. In September, the group went on the School's for Fools tour across the US, alongside Valencia, Just Surrender and Metro Station. However, partway through the tour Valencia had to drop off the tour due to their vocalist Shane Henderson having strep throat. As a result, Just Surrender headlined the rest of the dates. The group supported Boys Like Girls on their US headlining tour, dubbed Tourzilla, from late September to late October. It was released on October 2, 2007. From mid-January to early March 2008, the band supported Cobra Starship on their North America tour. In April, the band appeared at the Bamboozle Left festival. In June, the band supported Cobra Starship on their US tour, dubbed Really Really Really Ridiculously Good Looking Tour Out to Warped Tour Tour.

Between June and August 2008, the band performed on the Warped Tour. In October and November, the band supported the Academy Is... on their headlining tour of the US. In October, a re-recorded version of "Check Yes Juliet" was posted online. The re-recording's lyrics were altered to include a reference to Tampa Bay Rays. On December 12, a music video was released for "Secret Valentine" through the band's Myspace profile. In February and March 2009, the group went on a headlining US tour, dubbed The Secret Valentine Tour, with support from the Maine, the Cab, There for Tomorrow and VersaEmerge. In April, the band performed on the Bamboozle Roadshow and appeared at The Bamboozle festival in early May. At the end of May, the band performed at the Slam Dunk Festival. In July, the band supported All Time Low on their US east coast tour.

Reception

The album peaked at No. 3 on Billboard's Top Heatseekers chart, and at No. 151 on the Billboard 200. We the Kings was certified platinum by the Australian Recording Industry Association (ARIA) for the shipment of 75,000 copies. Three singles were released from the album. The album's second single "Check Yes Juliet", gained commercial success. It was featured as "The iTunes Single of the Week" in early 2008, and it peaked at No. 84 on the Pop 100 and No. 70 on the Billboard Hot 100 in the US, and No. 26 in Australia where it was certified platinum by the ARIA. Cleveland.com ranked "Check Yes Juliet" at number 60 on their list of the top 100 pop-punk songs.

Track listing
All songs by Travis Clark and Sam Hollander, except "Headlines Read Out..." by Clark.

"Secret Valentine" – 3:28
"Skyway Avenue" – 3:26
"Check Yes Juliet" – 3:40
"Stay Young" – 2:49
"Whoa" – 2:37
"August Is Over" – 3:16
"The Quiet" – 3:12
"Don't Speak Liar" – 3:01
"Headlines Read Out..." – 3:14
"All Again for You" – 3:06
"This Is Our Town" – 2:29

Deluxe edition bonus tracks
"Check Yes Juliet (acoustic)" – 3:56
"Skyway Avenue (acoustic)" – 3:50

Personnel
Personnel per booklet.

We the Kings
 Travis Clark – lead vocals, guitar
 Hunter Thomsen – guitar, backing vocals
 Drew Thomsen – bass
 Danny Duncan – drums

Design
 Zach Nicodemo – graphic design, layout
 Mike Ski – art direction
 Shane McCauley – photography

Production
 S*A*M and Sluggo – producer
 Sean Gould – engineer
 Scott Riebling – engineer
 Lou Giordano – mixing (all except tracks 1, 3 and 4)
 Tom Lord-Alge – mixing 
 Femio Hernandez – assistant
 Chris Gehringer – mastering

Charts 

Album

Singles

Certifications

References

External links

We the Kings at YouTube (streamed copy where licensed)

2007 debut albums
We the Kings albums
Albums produced by S*A*M and Sluggo